High Security Prison, Sahiwal is a jail in Sahiwal, Punjab, Pakistan, constructed to confine high-profile prisoners convicted in cases of terrorism and sabotage activities.

Background
The jail which has been constructed on 98 acres with an estimated cost of Rs930.206 million will have capacity to hold 1,044 prisoners.

It has an automatic locking system in individual cells and accommodates prisoners from other provinces. It also follows a provision incorporated in the Protection of Pakistan Bill 2014. It has 70 percent of cellular confinement (500 individual cells) and 30 percent barrack system (6 barracks).

See also

 Government of Punjab, Pakistan
 Punjab Prisons
 Prison Officer
 Headquarter Jail
 National Academy for Prisons Administration
 Punjab Prisons Staff Training Institute
 Punjab Prison Staff Training College, Sahiwal

References

External links
 Official Website of Punjab Prisons (Pakistan)

Prisons in Pakistan
Sahiwal District